The men's team pursuit race of the 2013 World Single Distance Speed Skating Championships was held on 24 March at 18:51 local time.

Results

References

Men team pursuit